Dæhlenengen Ski- og Ballklubb was a multi-sports club located in Grünerløkka, Oslo. Founded 18 March 1916, the club had departments within bandy, football and skiing. Their home ground was Dælenenga idrettspark. 

On 30 October 1940, the club merged with neighbours SK Strong, and the new name of the club was Sportsklubben Trym. Due to the German occupation of Norway, there was no activity in the new club before the end of World War II in 1945. It was then decided that the club was taking back the name Strong. In 1952, Strong merged with two other Grünerløkka-based clubs and formed Grüner IL.

Football

Dæhlenengen SBK's football team became regional champions in class C in 1925, class D in 1926 and class B in 1928. The team played in Oslo's class A from 1929 till the end of the 1935 season. John Bøhleng represented Dæhlenengen while playing for Norway in 1933.

References

Defunct football clubs in Norway
Defunct bandy clubs in Norway
Sport in Oslo
Association football clubs established in 1916
Association football clubs disestablished in 1940
1916 establishments in Norway
1940 disestablishments in Norway